The 1947 Texas Longhorns football team was an American football team that represented the University of Texas as a member of the Southwest Conference (SWC) during the 1947 college football season. In its first season under head coach Blair Cherry, the team compiled a 10–1 record (5–1 against SWC opponents), won the SWC championship, and outscored opponents by a total of 292 to 74. The team lost to SMU and defeated Alabama in the 1948 Sugar Bowl.

Bobby Layne was a consensus selection as the quarterback for the 1947 College Football All-America Team. He also finished sixth in the 1947 voting for the Heisman Trophy. Tackle Richard Harris was also selected as a first-team All-American by the Associated Press (AP).

Three Texas players were selected by the AP as first-team honorees on the 1947 All-Southwest Conference football team: Layne at quarterback; Harris at tackle; and Max Bumgardner at end.

Schedule

Roster
QB Bobby Layne
DB Tom Landry

Awards and honors
Bobby Layne
Consensus All-American
Sugar Bowl Most Valuable Player

References

Texas
Texas Longhorns football seasons
Sugar Bowl champion seasons
Texas Longhorns football